Kate J. Brooks is an astronomer at the CSIRO Australia Telescope National Facility, where she works as a Research Scientist. With over 40 refereed publications to her name, she has developed a strong reputation in the field of galactic star-forming regions.

Brooks is a strong supporter of young women scientists and early career researchers, and as a result she is a member of the inaugural steering committee for the Societies Chapter on Women in Astronomy.

Education 
Brooks was awarded her PhD in 2000 for studies on the Carina Nebula.

Career

Brooks was Vice-President of the Australia Astronomical Society in 2009-2010 and President 2011–2012.

She has been Deputy Head of Operations of the Australia Telescope National Facility and an Honorary Associate of the School of Physics at the University of Sydney, an editorial Board Member of the PASA Publications of the Astronomical Society of Australia.

From 2011 to 2013 she was the President of Council for the Astronomical Society of Australia

 2011 Executive officer for CSIRO telescope ASKAP
 2004-2007 CSIRO Boulton Fellow
 1998 – 2003 European Southern Observatory, University of Chile

References

External links
 
 
 http://www.cata.cl/publicaciones_en.php (Accessed 7 August 2014) 

Living people
21st-century Australian astronomers
Women astronomers
Australian women scientists
Year of birth missing (living people)